Rudd Government may refer to the following Australian governments:

 Rudd government (2007–10)
 Rudd government (2013)